Events from the 1490s in Denmark.

Incumbents
 Monarch — King John
 Steward of the Realm — Poul Laxmand

Events

1492
 Faxe Church is constructed on the foundation of an older church.

1497
 St. Clare's Priory is founded by King John I and Queen Christina with a gift of the former royal vegetable gardens in Copenhagen.

Births
 12 November 1492 – Johan Rantzau, general and statesman (died 1565)
 15 July 1497 – Francis of Denmark, son of John of Denmark (died 1511)

Undated
 Jørgen Sadolin (c. 1490), Lutheran reformer (died 1559)
 Peder Skram (c. 1497), naval admiral (died 1581)

Deaths
 10 November 1495 – Dorothea of Brandenburg, Queen consort of Denmark (born c. 1430 in Brandenburg)

References

1490s in Denmark